Marko Kranjec is a former Slovenian politician. He served as the country's first Minister of Finance (formally as 'Secretary of Finance') from 16 May 1990 to 8 May 1991.

In 2007, he became governor of the Bank of Slovenia. He served in this role for six years and Boštjan Jazbec was appointed as his successor.

References 

Living people
Year of birth missing (living people)
Place of birth missing (living people)
Finance ministers of Slovenia
20th-century Slovenian politicians
Governors of the Bank of Slovenia